Symphony No. 12 in G major, K. 110/75b, by Wolfgang Amadeus Mozart, was composed in Salzburg in the summer of 1771. The symphony was apparently prepared in anticipation of Mozart's second Italian journey, which was to take place between August and December 1771. The symphony is in four movements, the opening allegro being the longest movement that Mozart had written to that date. It is the first of a group of works "painted on a larger canvas and achieving a greater individuality than his earlier exuberant pieces".

Movements and instrumentation
The instrumentation is: strings, 2 oboes, 2 horns, 2 flutes, 2 bassoons, continuo.

Allegro, 
Andante, 
Menuetto and Trio, 
Allegro, 

The minuet features a canon between high and low strings at the interval of a single bar. Mozart likely learned this technique from Joseph Haydn's 23rd Symphony from 1764 (also in G major).

Performance details
There are no confirmed details as to first performance. It is possible that this symphony was first played at a concert in Milan, on 22 or 23 November 1771. This concert may also have seen the premiere of Mozart's 13th symphony.

References

Sources
Kenyon, Nicholas: The Pegasus Pocket Guide to Mozart Pegasus Books, New York 2006 
Zaslaw, Neal: Mozart's Symphonies: Context, Performance Practice, Reception OUP, Oxford 1991

External links

12
1771 compositions
Compositions in G major